The 2018 World Rowing Cup was held over three regattas, or stages, from 1 June to 15 July 2018.

Stage 1

The first event of the 2018 World Rowing Cup took place in Belgrade, Serbia, 1–3 June 2018.

Medal summary

Stage 2
The second event of the 2018 World Rowing Cup took place in Ottensheim near Linz, Austria, 21–24 June 2018.

Medal summary

Stage 3
The third event of the 2018 World Rowing Cup took place in Lucerne, Switzerland, 13–15 July 2018.

Medal summary

World Cup standings

References

World Rowing Cup
2018 World Rowing Cup